Chris Robertson may refer to:
Chris Robertson (squash player), former professional squash player from Australia
Chris Robertson (footballer, born 1914) (1914–1995), English football defender (Grimsby Town)
Chris Robertson (footballer, born 1957), Scottish football striker (Rangers, Heart of Midlothian)
Chris Robertson (footballer, born 1986), Scottish football defender (Port Vale, Ross County)
Christopher T. Robertson (born 1975), legal academic (Boston University)
Chris Robertson (American football), American football coach
Chris Robertson (runner), American runner and entrepreneur

See also
Chris Roberson (disambiguation)